Sasano (written: 笹野) is a Japanese surname. Notable people with the surname include:

 Hiroshi Sasano, Japanese middle-distance runner
 Michiru Sasano, Japanese pop singer and songwriter
, Japanese actor

Japanese-language surnames